Momshies! Ang Soul Mo'y Akin! is a 2021 Philippine comedy fantasy film directed by Easy Ferrer. It stars Jolina Magdangal, Karla Estrada, Melai Cantiveros, Manuel Chua, Jason Francisco and Thou Reyes.

Cast
 Jolina Magdangal as Jolene
 Karla Estrada as Karlene
 Melai Cantiveros as Mylene
 Manuel Chua as JB
 Jason Francisco as Clark
 Thou Reyes as Kimberly
 JhaiHo as Keng
 Mitoy Yonting as Luke
 Miko Gallardo as Jeremiah
 Juliana Parizcova Segovia as Pipay
 Pia Moran as Amanda
 Eris Aragoza as Banchong
 Francis Mata as Lolo
 Johannes Rissler as Nectar
 Sunshine Teodoro as Jolene's Mom
 Gabo Adeva as Beyo / Albularyo
 Jervi Li as KaladKaren Davila
 Dean Airo Salvador Dancel as Wally
 Marvin Agustin as Wally (voice)
 Loi Villarama as Board Member Head
 Cheryl Cabanos as Luke's Mistress
 Melai Entuna as Wally's Fiancée
 Leilani Kate Yalung as Jeremiah's New Girlfriend
 Rica Castaño as News Reporter / Wedding Guest
 Yuan Isles as Salon Hair Stylist / Talkshow Staff and Crew

Production
Momshies! Ang Soul Mo'y Akin! was directed by Easy Ferrer under ABS-CBN Film Productions (Star Cinema) and Keep Filming. The film features three friends who had their bodies swapped. The protagonists of the film were portrayed by Jolina Magdangal, Melai Cantiveros, Karla Estrada who in real life are long time friends. The three co-hosts in Magandang Buhay, where they affectionally call each other "momshies". Production of the film took place during the COVID-19 pandemic which meant that certain health protocols and restrictions had to be observed.

Release
The film was released in the Philippines via streaming in KTX.ph and iWantTFC on May 28, 2021.

Reception
LionhearTV give a film a 3 out of 5 rating and wrote :

References

External links
 

2021 comedy films
Filipino-language films
Philippine parody films
Films impacted by the COVID-19 pandemic
Star Cinema films
Star Cinema comedy films
Body swapping in films